The 1896 Montana gubernatorial election was held on November 3, 1896.

Democratic and Populist  nominee Robert Burns Smith defeated Republican and Silver Republican nominee Alexander C. Botkin with 70.99% of the vote.

General election

Candidates
Major party candidates
Robert Burns Smith, Democratic and Populist, former city attorney of Helena, Populist nominee for Montana's at-large congressional district in 1894
Alexander C. Botkin, Republican and Silver Republican, incumbent Lieutenant Governor of Montana

Results

By 8 a.m. the following day, the chairman of the central committee for the state's Democratic party announced that, in his estimation, Robert Burns Smith had won the election "handsomely".

References

Bibliography
 
 
 
 

1896
Montana
Gubernatorial